The Battle of Mangal was a battle fought between the Sikh forces led by Hari Singh Nalwa and the Jaduns and Tanaolis tribes led by Mahomed Khan and Bostan Khan.

Background and Battle

Maharaja Ranjit Singh summoned Hari Singh Nalwa to give an account of his charge. He marched by Muzaffarabad and Pakhli with 7,000 foot soldiers. When he reached Mangal, he found a large tribal host of around 25,000 troops. Their leader, Mohammad Khan Tarain, determined to oppose the Sikh's passage was ready to give them a battle. Despite being outnumbered, the Sikhs stormed their stockades and defeated there opponents with a loss to them of 2,000 men.

Aftermath

The Jaduns to save their town paid down a fine of 5 and a half rupees per house to the Sikhs. Hari Singh Nalwa then build a fort at Nawanshahr, garrisoned it, and went to lower Hazara. The Maharaja partly pleased with treasures and presents brought from Kashmir, and partly to reward his lieutenant for the Mangal victory, excused Hari Singh Nalwa from rendering any accounts of his Kashmir charge, and made him the government of the entirety of Hazara.

See also 
 Nihang
 Martyrdom and Sikhism

References

Battles involving the Sikhs
History of India